Zdena Dorňáková (born 25 June 1957) is a Czech gymnast. She competed in six events at the 1972 Summer Olympics.

References

External links
 

1957 births
Living people
Czech female artistic gymnasts
Olympic gymnasts of Czechoslovakia
Gymnasts at the 1972 Summer Olympics
People from Valašské Meziříčí
Sportspeople from the Zlín Region